On May 24, 2022, a mass shooting occurred at Robb Elementary School in Uvalde, Texas, United States, where 18-year-old Salvador Ramos, a former student at the school, fatally shot nineteen students and two teachers, while seventeen others survived despite being injured. Earlier that day, he shot his grandmother in the face at home, severely wounding her. He fired shots for approximately five minutes outside the school, before entering unobstructed with an AR-15 style rifle through an unlocked side entrance door. He then shut himself inside two adjoining classrooms, without locking the classroom door, killed the victims, and remained in the school for more than an hour before members of the United States Border Patrol Tactical Unit (BORTAC) fatally shot him after they bypassed numerous local and state officers who had been in the school's hallways for over an hour. The shooting is the third-deadliest school shooting in the United States, after the Virginia Tech shooting in 2007 and the Sandy Hook Elementary School shooting in 2012, and the deadliest in Texas. 

Police officers waited more than 1 hour and 14 minutes on-site before breaching the classroom to engage the shooter. Police also cordoned off the school grounds, resulting in violent conflicts between police and civilians, including parents, who were attempting to enter the school to rescue children. As a consequence, law enforcement officials in Uvalde have been heavily criticized for their response to the shooting, and their conduct is being reviewed in separate investigations by the Texas Ranger Division and the United States Department of Justice. Texas Department of Public Safety (DPS) officials laid much of the responsibility for the police response on Uvalde Consolidated Independent School District Police Department (UCISD PD) Chief Pedro Arredondo, who they identified as the incident commander. Arredondo refuted the characterization of his role as incident commander, but was later fired by the Uvalde school board for his actions during the shooting. A report conducted by the Texas House of Representatives Investigative Committee attributed the fault more widely to "systemic failures and egregious poor decision making" by many authorities. The report said, "At Robb Elementary, law enforcement responders failed to adhere to their active shooter training, and they failed to prioritize saving the lives of innocent victims over their own safety... there was an unacceptably long period of time before officers breached the classroom, neutralized the attacker, and began rescue efforts."

Shortly after the shooting, local and state officials gave inaccurate reports of the timeline of events and exaggerated police actions. The Texas Department of Public Safety acknowledged that it was an error for law enforcement to delay an assault on Ramos' position in the student-filled classrooms, attributing this to the school district police chief's assessment of the situation as one with a "barricaded subject" instead of an "active shooter". Law enforcement was also aware there were injured individuals in the school before they made their entrance.

Following the shooting, which occurred 10 days after the 2022 Buffalo shooting, wider discussions ensued about American gun culture and violence, gridlock in politics, and law enforcement's failure to halt or intervene during the attack. Around a month after the shooting, Congress passed the Bipartisan Safer Communities Act and President Biden signed the bill into law; it was the most significant federal gun reform legislation since the Federal Assault Weapons Ban of 1994.

Following the shooting, Robb Elementary is set to be demolished amid its permanent closure.

Background 

In 2022, about 90% of Robb Elementary School's 600 students in the second through fourth grades were Hispanic, and about 81% of the student population came from economically disadvantaged backgrounds. On the day of the shooting, there had been an awards ceremony at the school.

School security preparations
The city of Uvalde spent 40% of its municipal budget on its police department in the 2019–2020 fiscal year, and UCISD, the school district operating Robb Elementary School, had multiple security measures in place at the time of the shooting. The Uvalde Consolidated Independent School District Police Department (UCISD PD) had a six-officer police department responsible for security at the district's eight schools. It had also more than doubled its expenditures on security measures in the four years preceding the shooting, and in 2021, it expanded its police force from four officers to six officers. The state of Texas had given UCISD a $69,141 grant to improve security measures as part of a $100 million statewide allocation made after the 2018 Santa Fe High School shooting, in which ten people were slain. The district also had a security staff that patrolled door entrances and parking lots at secondary school campuses. Since 2020, Pedro "Pete" Arredondo had served as UCISD's police chief.

The school and school district had extensive security measures in place. The school used Social Sentinel, a software service that monitored the social media accounts of students and other Uvalde-affiliated people to identify threats made against students or staff. The district's written security plan noted the use of the Raptor Visitor Management System in schools to scan visitor identity documents and check them against watch-lists, as well as the use of two-way radios, fence enclosures around campus, school threat-assessment teams, and a policy of locking the doors of classrooms. According to a report released by the Texas House of Representatives on July 17, although the official school policy was for exterior and interior doors to remain locked, staff members would often unlock or open doors due to a lack of keys. Additionally, some employees were desensitized to the intruder alert system, as it was almost always used for incidents of an undocumented migrant in the area running from police.

UCISD held joint security training exercises in August 2020 along with the Uvalde Police Department, the Uvalde County Sheriff's Department, and other local law enforcement agencies. UCISD also hosted an active shooter scenario training exercise in March 2022, which covered a range of topics, such as solo responses to active shooters, first aid and evacuation, and scenarios enacted through role-playing. The exercise also covered the ability to compare and contrast an active shooter situation versus a barricaded subject or hostage crisis where an armed person isolates themselves with limited to no ability to harm others. The March 2022 training materials for UCISD said, "Time is the number-one enemy during active shooter response ... The best hope that innocent victims have is that officers immediately move into action to isolate, distract or neutralize the threat, even if that means one officer acting alone." The materials also put forth the position that a "first responder unwilling to place the lives of the innocent above their own safety should consider another career field".

Events

Shooting 
On May 24, 2022, Salvador Ramos and his 66-year-old grandmother had an argument over a phone bill at their home in Uvalde, during which he shot her in the face, before taking her black 2008 Ford F-150. She survived and sought help from neighbors while police officers were called in. She was then airlifted to a hospital in San Antonio in critical condition.

Ramos, using his Facebook account, sent three private messages to a 15-year-old girl from Germany whom he had met online prior to the shooting: the first to say that he was going to shoot his grandmother; a second to say that he had shot his grandmother; and a third, about 15 minutes before the shooting, to say that he was going to open fire at an elementary school. The girl replied "cool." Later she faced trial in Frankfurt, Germany and was found guilty of "failing to report planned crimes". She was issued a warning and was required to "undergo educational measures". A spokesperson for Meta, the parent company of Facebook, said the posts were "private one-to-one text messages" discovered after the shooting took place.

Ramos crashed his grandmother's truck through a barricade and into a concrete ditch outside Robb Elementary School at 11:28a.m. CDT (UTC–5) and proceeded to scale a fence and enter the school grounds.  According to police, he wore a tactical vest for carrying ammunition that did not include ballistic protection or armor insert panels, plus a backpack, and all-black clothing, while carrying an AR-15 style rifle and seven 30-round magazines. He brought into the school only one of the two rifles that he had legally bought, and left the other in the crashed truck. A witness said he first fired at two people at a nearby funeral home, both of whom escaped uninjured. Police reported receiving 9-1-1 calls about a vehicle having crashed near the school. After hearing of the 9-1-1 call, a school resource officer drove to the school's campus and pursued a teacher whom the officer erroneously believed to be the gunman, driving past the actual gunman in the process.

Ramos entered the school through its west-facing entrance door, which had been shut by a teacher who had seen him. The entrance door did not lock despite being designed to be locked when shut. UCISD's police chief estimated that the shooting began at 11:32; according to a Facebook post by the school, the school was placed in lockdown at 11:43 in response to gunshots heard in the vicinity. A report released on July 6 found that an officer had aimed his rifle at Ramos before he entered the school, but did not fire because he was awaiting his supervisor's permission.

After entering the building, Ramos walked down two short hallways and then entered a classroom that was internally connected to another classroom.  All of the fatalities were located in these adjoining classrooms, 111 and 112.  A survivor of the shooting said that, as teacher Irma Garcia attempted to lock the door to the classroom, he shot the door's window, then backed Garcia into the classroom, and said, "Goodnight", as he shot and killed her. Another survivor recounted that Ramos said, "You're all gonna die", after entering the classroom. He then opened fire on the rest of the students and another teacher in the room. According to a surviving student, Ramos played "sad music" during the massacre.

Most of the shooting occurred inside the building within the first few minutes; Ramos was inside the classroom for over an hour while armed police remained outside the classroom and building. Multiple students played dead while the shooting took place, including one student, 11-year-old Miah Cerrillo, who smeared herself with the blood of one of her dead classmates to give credence to the subterfuge. According to a student who hid in the adjoining classroom, Ramos came in and slightly crouched down saying, "It's time to die", before opening fire. Afterwards, a responding officer called out, "Yell if you need help!" A girl in the adjoining classroom said, "Help". Ramos heard the girl, entered the classroom, and shot her. A student said that the officer then barged into the classroom, and Ramos fired at the officer, causing more officers to return fire.

Arnulfo Reyes, a teacher in classroom 111 who received multiple gunshot wounds, recalled he instructed his students to "get under the table and act like you're asleep". Ramos then arrived and shot him, then he fired indiscriminately around classroom 111. Reyes said he "didn't hear talk for a while," but later on, Ramos unleashed a second round of gunfire at students, and Reyes said, "If he didn't get them the first time, he got them the second time." All 11 students in classroom 111 during the shooting died. Reyes pretended to be unconscious on the floor, but Ramos then shot him again. According to Reyes, he heard law enforcement approach his classroom from what sounded like the hallway three times, but they did not enter; during one of these occasions, he heard a student from the adjoining classroom 112 saying, "Officer, we're in here. We're in here." As law enforcement had already left, Reyes said Ramos "walked over there, and he shot again". Reyes later heard law enforcement telling Ramos to come out of the classroom to talk, saying they did not want to hurt anyone. Separately, Reyes said in past security checks, the classroom 111 door that was meant to be locked during lessons remained unlocked because "the latch was stuck", and that he had told the principal about this issue.

A male student in classroom 109 said that around 15 minutes after the shooting began, the gunman approached classroom 109's door and pulled its handle, but his teacher had jammed the door after hearing gunfire. The gunman shot through the door's glass window, striking another student and the teacher in classroom 109, then left. With a Texas official stating that the gunman had briefly returned into the hallway after entering classrooms 111 and 112 (without specifying what time this occurred), The Washington Post reported that "this is likely when those in Room 109 were shot at," before the gunman returned to classrooms 111 and 112.

Officers arrived three minutes after Ramos entered the school and approached rooms 111 and 112, but they retreated after Ramos fired at them. Officers were not successful in establishing negotiations.

Additional emergency response 

At 12:17, UCISD sent out a message on Twitter that there was an active shooter at the elementary school. The school district's police chief, Pedro Arredondo, erroneously determined that the situation had "transitioned from an active shooter to a barricaded subject" according to the Texas Department of Public Safety (DPS). With Ramos thought to be contained, officials believed they had bought enough time to bring in tactical units.

According to Uvalde County judge Bill Mitchell, teacher Eva Mireles, from inside the adjoining classrooms where the shooter was, called her husband, Ruben Ruiz, a Uvalde Consolidated Independent School District officer, who was outside the school. According to DPS Director Steven McCraw, during the call Mireles told Ruiz that she had been shot and was dying; when Ruiz "tried to move forward into the hallway, he was detained [by law enforcement] and they took his gun away from him and escorted him off the scene." Mireles eventually died from her gunshot wounds.

After the police cordoned off the outside of the school, parents pleaded with officers to enter the building. When they did not, parents offered to enter the building themselves. Officers held back and tackled parents who tried to enter the school, further warning that they would use tasers if the parents did not comply with directions; video clips were uploaded to social media, including one that depicted a parent being pinned to the ground. Police pepper-sprayed a parent trying to get to their child, and an officer tackled the father of another student. Police reportedly used a taser on a parent who approached a bus to get their child. A mother of two students at the school was placed in handcuffs by officers for attempting to enter the school. When released from the handcuffs, she jumped the fence and retrieved her children, exiting before police entered. A video clip showed parents questioning why police were not trying to save their children, to which an officer replies: "Because I'm having to deal with you!"

A United States Border Patrol Tactical Unit (BORTAC) agent rushed to the scene after receiving a text message from his wife, who was a teacher there. Prior to this, the agent had been off-duty. The agent immediately set out with a shotgun his barber had lent him and arrived on the scene approximately an hour after the first responders arrived. He then proceeded to help evacuate children. Contrary to online rumors and social media posts, he did not enter the school or kill the shooter. Additional BORTAC agents arrived, but they did not have a battering ram or other breaching tools, so a U.S. Marshal on the scene provided agents with a ballistic shield. Ramos stayed in the classroom for around one hour, hiding behind a steel door that officers said they could not open until they obtained a master key from the janitor. There is evidence, however, that the door was never locked.

After the door was opened, a BORTAC agent entered the room holding the shield, followed by two other BORTAC agents, a Border Patrol Search, Trauma, and Rescue agent (BORSTAR), and at least one sheriff's deputy. Ramos reportedly opened fire at the group from a closet in the room before officials returned fire and killed him.

Account by Pedro Arredondo 
In an interview by The Texas Tribune published on June 9, Arredondo said he arrived at the school thinking he was the first law enforcement officer on the scene; he abandoned his police and campus radios because he wanted his hands free to shoot the gunman, and he also thought the radios would slow him down. He said one radio's antenna would hit him when he ran, while the other radio was prone to falling off his belt when he ran, and that he knew from experience that the radios did not work in some school buildings. Arredondo said he was unaware of 9-1-1 calls being made from the classrooms the gunman was in because he did not have a radio and no one told him; the other officers in the school hallway were not in radio communication either.

In The Texas Tribune interview, Arredondo said that he did not consider himself as the incident commander for law enforcement; instead, his role was a frontline responder, with him assuming someone else was in command. The National Incident Management System, which guides all levels of government on how to respond to mass emergency events, says that the first person on scene is the incident commander. DPS officials have described Arredondo as the incident commander and identified him as giving the order to treat the situation as a barricaded subject. Arredondo said that he attempted to open classroom 111's door, while an Uvalde Police Department officer tried classroom 112's door, but both were locked. According to Arredondo, the classroom door had a steel jamb, that prevented law enforcement from easily breaching the door.

Arredondo was aware that the gunman was firing shots from within the classroom, grazing some police officers. According to Arredondo, he and the officers in the school hallway did their best to remain quiet, only whispering to each other, fearing that if the gunman heard them, he would shoot at them. He spent over an hour in the hallway, of which he held back from the classroom doors for 40 minutes to avoid attracting gunfire. Arredondo said that during the wait for door breaching tools, he tried to talk to the gunman through the walls to establish rapport, but got no response.

Also in The Texas Tribune interview, Arredondo said he was provided with six keys, which he tried on a door adjacent to the room where the gunman was, but none opened the door; later he received another 20-30 keys which also did not work, and that eventually, other officers called his cellphone to inform him that they obtained a suitable key to open the door. Arredondo denied cowardice and incompetence, stating that law enforcement's "objective was to save as many lives as we could, and the extraction of the students from the classrooms by all that were involved saved over 500 of our Uvalde students and teachers before we gained access to the shooter and eliminated the threat."

Timeline of events 
Below is a timeline of events, according to law enforcement and other sources. This timeline is still under investigation. As of June 19, 2022, there are multiple disputes about the timeline.

Victims 
Nineteen students and two teachers were killed in the shooting:
Students

 Nevaeh Alyssa Bravo, 10
 Jacklyn Jaylen Cazares, 9
 Makenna Lee Elrod, 10
 Jose Manuel Flores Jr., 10
 Eliahna Amyah Garcia, 9
 Uziyah Sergio Garcia, 10
 Amerie Jo Garza, 10
 Xavier James Lopez, 10
 Jayce Carmelo Luevanos, 10
 Tess Marie Mata, 10
 Maranda Gail Mathis, 11
 Alithia Haven Ramirez, 10
 Annabell Guadalupe Rodriguez, 10
 Maite Yuleana Rodriguez, 10
 Alexandria Aniyah Rubio, 10
 Layla Marie Salazar, 11
 Jailah Nicole Silguero, 10
 Eliahna Cruz Torres, 10
 Rojelio Fernandez Torres, 10

Teachers
 Irma Linda Garcia, 48
 Eva Mireles, 44

The children were in the fourth grade. The teachers taught in the same fourth-grade classroom.

Eighteen people were injured, comprising fourteen children, one teacher, the perpetrator's grandmother, and two police officers. Abbott said the two officers were struck by bullets but had no serious injuries. Several victims died in the ambulance on the way to the hospital, including Mireles. Uvalde Memorial Hospital's CEO reported that eleven children and three other people were admitted for emergency care following the shooting. Four were released, and two, described only as a male and a female, were dead upon arrival. Four other victims, the perpetrator's grandmother and three students, were taken to the University Hospital in San Antonio.

Perpetrator 

Born on May 16, 2004, in Fargo, North Dakota, Salvador Rolando Ramos was a resident of Uvalde from an early age and was a former student at Uvalde High School. He also attended Robb Elementary School for fourth grade in the same classroom where he was killed. He was frequently bullied at school due to his stutter, short haircut, and for wearing the same clothes because his family was unable to afford more. At one point another student tied his shoelaces together, causing him to fall face down. Lt. Chris Olivarez from Texas DPS claimed that Ramos had no friends. Furthermore, he did not have a criminal record or any documented mental health issues. However, he had searched the term "sociopath" and received an email about possible treatment. He had also previously posted violent threats online. School officials at Uvalde High School withdrew him from the school on October 28, 2021 due to his frequent absences.

Ramos' social media acquaintances said he openly abused and killed animals such as cats and would livestream the abuse on Yubo. Other social media acquaintances said that he would also livestream himself on Yubo threatening to kidnap and rape girls who used the app, as well as threatening to commit a school shooting. Ramos' account was reported to Yubo, but no action was taken. Up until a month before the shooting, Ramos worked at a local Wendy's and had been employed there for at least a year. According to the store's night manager, he went out of his way to keep to himself. One of his coworkers said he was occasionally rude to his female co-workers, to whom he sent inappropriate text messages, and would intimidate co-workers at his job by asking them, "Do you know who I am?" Ramos' coworkers referred to him by names including "school shooter" because he had long hair and frequently wore black clothing.

A year before the shooting, Ramos started posting pictures to his Instagram account of semi-automatic rifles that were on his wish list. According to a friend of his, he would often drive around at night with another friend, shooting at strangers with a BB gun and egging cars. According to a man who was in a relationship with Ramos' mother, Ramos moved out of his mother's house and into his grandparents' house two months before the shooting, after an argument broke out between him and his mother over her turning off the Wi-Fi. People close to Ramos' family described his mother as a drug user and said he frequently argued with her. Two months prior to the shooting, he posted a video of himself on Instagram aggressively arguing with his mother and referring to her as a "bitch". Ramos' mother described her son as "not a monster" but admitted that he could "be aggressive". His grandfather said that his grandson did not have a driver's license and did not know how to drive. According to his father, Ramos had a girlfriend, who lived in San Antonio. On May 14, Ramos sent a private Instagram message reading, "10 more days". A person responded, "Are you going to shoot up a school or something?" He replied, "No, stop asking dumb questions. You'll see."

According to the Texas Department of Public Safety, in September 2021, Ramos asked his older sister to buy him a gun, but she refused. On May 17, 2022, a day after his 18th birthday, he legally purchased a Smith & Wesson semi-automatic rifle from a local gun store. He then purchased another rifle three days later. Investigators later found that his gun had a "hellfire" trigger device, which decreases the time required for the trigger to reset, increasing the possible rate of fire. Ramos sent an Instagram message to an acquaintance he met through Yubo, which showed the receipt for an AR-15 style rifle purchased from Georgia-based online retailer Daniel Defense eight days before the shooting. He posted a picture of two rifles on his Instagram account three days before the shooting.

Ahead of the shooting, Ramos had purchased 1,657 total rounds of ammunition, which included 375 rounds of 5.56 NATO ammunition purchased on May 18, 2022. A total of 315 rounds were found inside the school, consisting of 142 spent cartridges and 173 live rounds. Additionally, a total of 922 rounds were found on school property outside the building, consisting of 22 spent cartridges and 900 live rounds. Overall, Ramos fired 164 rounds during the shooting. Police and Border Patrol officers fired a combined total of 35 rounds during the shooting: eight in the hallway and 27 in the classroom where Ramos was killed.

Investigations 
The Federal Bureau of Investigation (FBI) and the Bureau of Alcohol, Tobacco, Firearms and Explosives (ATF) are assisting local police in the investigation. Ramos' guns and magazines were recovered by law enforcement for analysis. Two days after the shooting, state officials said that the Texas Ranger Division was investigating local police's conduct during the incident. On May 29, the United States Department of Justice announced it would review the law enforcement response to the mass shooting at the request of Uvalde Mayor, Don McLaughlin.

After initially praising first responders, Governor Greg Abbott called for an investigation into the lack of initiative displayed by law enforcement. On May 27, Abbott said, "Bottom line would be why did they not choose the strategy that would have been best to get in there and to eliminate the killer and to rescue the children?" On June 1, ABC News, citing multiple unnamed law enforcement sources, reported that the Uvalde Police Department (UPD) and the UCISD police force had stopped cooperating with investigations soon after the DPS said on May 27 that police had erred in delaying entry into the classroom. The DPS responded that the UPD and UCISD police force "have been cooperating with investigators", while specifying that UCISD police chief Pedro Arredondo "provided an initial interview but has not responded to a request for a follow-up interview with the Texas Rangers that was made two days ago." Also on June 1, Arredondo told CNN that he was "in contact with DPS everyday", and said he would not release further information about the events of the shooting while funerals are ongoing, citing respect for families: "Whenever this is done and the families quit grieving, then we'll do that obviously."

When Uvalde Police Department's acting chief, Lieutenant Mariano Pargas, was interviewed by authorities two days after the shooting, he did not mention that he had known at the time that there were children in the classroom with the shooter. Pargas said that he had officer Ruben Ruiz removed from the hallway after Ruiz said that Ruiz's wife was shot in her classroom, because "we were just afraid that he was gonna try to run in the classroom and try to do what I wanted to do if I could have done it". When Pargas was interviewed again in mid-June and asked about 911 calls made from inside the classroom, Pargas said he cannot remember, and does not mention that he had called his department's dispatchers, who told him about 911 calls from children inside the classroom. Instead, Pargas said: "The last thing we thought was that [the shooter] had actually shot the kids. We thought he had shot up in the air, broken the lights. We had no idea what was behind those doors."

Texas House Investigative Committee 
On June 9, a committee of three started their investigations into the shooting on behalf of the Texas House of Representatives; the committee consisted of Representative Dustin Burrows (R-Lubbock), Representative Joe Moody (D-El Paso) and former Texas Supreme Court member Eva Guzman (R). That day, committee leader Burrows explained that the investigation would be done in private out of "respect for the process" and wanting to be "thorough" and "accurate" before revealing "any conclusions". On June 20, before the committee had a hearing at Uvalde City Hall, a fire marshal told parents, journalists, and a chaplain to leave the premises because "someone is intimidated".

Attempts to block release of police records 

On June 16, a private law firm hired by the City of Uvalde cited several reasons to prevent the release of police records related to the shooting. The stated reasons include: information that "is not of legitimate concern to the public"; "highly embarrassing information" related to criminal history; potential revealing of police "methods, techniques, and strategies for preventing and predicting crime"; potentially distressing information; potentially exposing city employees or officers to "a substantial threat of physical harm"; privacy; and the "dead suspect loophole," where information is suppressed for crimes in which no one has been convicted, including in cases where the suspect is dead.

Hallway video 
Freeman F. Martin, deputy director of Homeland Security Operations at the Texas DPS, informed Burrows that the district attorney of Uvalde County has objected to the release of a portion of a video taken in the hallway during the police response. The clip ended immediately before officers breached the classroom and did not show any images of children. Burrows, Martin, and Uvalde mayor Don McLaughlin believe that releasing the footage would be helpful to the public. On July 12, 2022, the Austin American-Statesman released 77 minutes of video composed of footage from hallway cameras and an officer's body worn camera. The released video was edited to obscure the identity of a student and to remove the sound of children screaming. The video was intended to be shown to the families of victims on Sunday, July 17, before it would be released publicly. The video was leaked early by the Austin American-Statesman on July 12, creating anger amongst some of the victims' families whilst others expressed support at the release.

The leaked video attracted further criticism and outrage, showing law enforcement to seemingly not understand the gravity of the situation, including one officer taking a pump of hand sanitizer from a dispenser, and two other officers exchanging a fist bump.

Legal proceedings 
A Uvalde staff member filed a petition for information about Daniel Defense on June 2, attempting to make a prima facie case against the gunmaker for its marketing of the weapons. The staff member had been outside delivering food to the school for an end-of-year party when she witnessed a car crash. She then had gone inside to grab her cellphone to call 9-1-1 about the crash and had propped open a door to the school with a rock but had kicked the door shut when she ran inside after witnessing the shooter hopping a fence and coming towards the school. This was one part of the misrepresented details that were published after the shooting.

On June 3, a parent of one of the deceased victims filed a letter, seeking documents and records from Daniel Defense, through lawyers that had represented families of victims of the 2012 Sandy Hook Elementary School shooting against the manufacturer of the rifle used in the shooting. On June 7, attorney Thomas J. Henry filed a lawsuit, on behalf of four families of students injured in the shooting, against Ramos' estate and sought answers about how he had gained access to the school. Henry said that the initial lawsuit would allow them to discover evidence and potentially add other parties to the lawsuit, with the discovery process focused on the school system, law enforcement, social media, and the gun and ammunition manufacturers.

Aftermath 
UCISD asked parents not to pick up their children until all Robb Elementary School students were accounted for. At around 2:00 p.m., parents were notified to pick them up. All district and campus activities were canceled, and the parents of students at other schools were asked to pick up their children due to school bus cancelations. That night, UCISD's superintendent Hal Harrel announced in a letter sent to parents that the school year had concluded for the entire district, similarly to what was done during the COVID-19 pandemic in Texas, including the cancelation of a planned graduation ceremony. The school year had previously been scheduled to end two days later on Thursday. Some parents had to wait late into the night for final confirmation of their child's death, awaiting DNA identification.

On the day of the shooting, Uvalde Memorial Hospital held an emergency blood drive for the victims. The South Texas Blood and Tissue Center issued an urgent request for blood donations after the shooting, and it sent 15 units of blood to Uvalde via helicopter to be used in area hospitals. On May 27, the center reported that more than 2,000 people donated blood after the shooting.

Memorials and tributes 

Shortly after the shooting, a memorial was created outside the school for the victims and survivors with balloons, candles, and crosses. A local man made 21 crosses, inscribed with the victims' names to be placed outside the school. Additional memorials were erected for the deceased victims throughout Uvalde by both locals and those who drove into the city to honor the victims. Other memorials and tributes were held throughout the country. Free headstones and funeral services were offered to the families of victims by local and state businesses. State and locally based food trucks and restaurant owners also traveled to Uvalde to offer food and supplies for families affected by the shooting. The San Antonio Zoo announced they would light up their parking garage red, Robb Elementary school's color for 21 days to honor each of the 21 victims.

Joe Garcia, the husband of Irma Garcia, one of the teachers murdered during the shooting, died two days after the shooting from a heart attack while attending a memorial. His family said the heart attack was tied to grief after losing his wife. They were survived by four of their children. UCISD created a fund through the First State Bank, with the money raised going to the families of the victims and survivors with donations accepted in person or by check. On May 27, it was announced that an anonymous donor had donated $175,000 to go towards the funerals of the victims. Fundraising was also seen on the crowdfunding platform GoFundMe, which set up a central hub for people looking to donate to help those affected by the shooting, in an effort to stop scammers from taking advantage of the shooting. As of May 27, about $7.5 million had been raised through the hub from donors across the U.S. and from over 91 countries. Additional fundraisers for the victims and their families were done through many avenues, such as item sales or proceeds from a barbecue.

Catholic Extension, a grant-giving nonprofit that finances impoverished parishes, announced it has endowed 30 full scholarships for students wounded in the Robb Elementary School mass shooting to attend Sacred Heart Catholic School, a private school in Uvalde.

Pedro Arredondo 
Chief Pedro "Pete" Arredondo disputed being the incident commander for law enforcement responding to the shooting. "By 12:46 p.m., Arredondo seemed to give his approval for officers to enter the room, the Times reported. "If y'all are ready to do it, you do it," he said, according to the transcript." He delivered two brief press statements on the day of the shooting (May 24) without answering any questions, then offered no public comments until June 1.

Arredondo had been elected to the Uvalde City Council on May 7, before the shooting occurred. On May 30, the mayor Don McLaughlin said that the "special City Council meeting" where Arredondo would have been sworn in as a City Council member "will not take place as scheduled", as the "focus on Tuesday is on our families who lost loved ones". McLaughlin commented that there is "nothing in the City Charter, Election Code, or Texas Constitution that prohibits [Arredondo] from taking the oath of office", and that he was "not aware of any investigation" of Arredondo. On May 31, McLaughlin revealed that Arredondo had personally visited City Hall that day and was sworn in as a City Council member, stating that the lack of a ceremony was done out of "respect for the families" whose children were killed in the shooting. Arredondo did not attend a City Council meeting on June 7; when mayor McLaughlin was questioned on Arredondo's absence, McLaughlin said he "can't answer that."

When journalists visited the UCISD headquarters, where Arredondo was, law enforcement ordered them to leave. A CNN journalist was given an initial warning, and was told that Uvalde Police were on their way and would charge journalists with criminal trespassing if they continued to remain at the headquarters. A San Antonio Express-News journalist was told by district officials that the headquarters are private property.

On June 3, UCISD's board held a meeting and decided not to take any disciplinary action against Arredondo at the time. He was put on administrative leave on June 22.

In an interview published June 9 in The Texas Tribune, Arredondo provided his first detailed public comments on the shooting. He said he did not speak out earlier to avoid blaming others or worsening the community's grief.

On July 2, Arredondo resigned from his position on the Uvalde city council. The Uvalde school board voted unanimously on August 24 to terminate Arredondo's contract as police chief.

Permanent closing of school 
On June 3, UCISD's board held a meeting and decided that the Robb Elementary School building would no longer be used as a school, with students and staff moving to a new campus. Superintendent Harrel announced that Robb Elementary School would never be reopened, out of concern for the potential to re-traumatize surviving students and staff or the wider community.

On June 21, Mayor McLaughlin announced that the Robb Elementary School building would be demolished.

A new school to replace the Robb Elementary School is set to begin construction in summer 2023. It is scheduled to open in fall 2024.

Potential copycat threats 
In the wake of the shooting, Donna Independent School District, which serves Donna, Texas, an area four and a half hours from Uvalde, received a "credible threat of violence". In response, the district canceled school while it investigated the threat. On June 7, the Department of Homeland Security warned, "Individuals in online forums that routinely promulgate domestic violent extremist and conspiracy theory-related content have praised [this shooting] and encouraged copycat attacks", while others tried to "spread disinformation and incite grievances, including claims it was a government-staged event meant to advance gun control measures".

Law enforcement failures and controversies

Confronting the shooter
Almost 400 law enforcement officers, including 150 U.S. Border Patrol agents and 91 Texas DPS officers, came to Uvalde during the shooting. Before tactical units arrived, police officers inside the school, who numbered at least 19, made "no effort" to breach the room where Ramos was located, according to the Texas Department of Public Safety (DPS). According to the DPS, the decision to wait for tactical units to arrive was based on the false belief that Ramos had been isolated to a classroom where he could do no more harm. This decision was made by the incident commander, identified as Pedro Arredondo, UCISD's chief of police.

Police arrested and handcuffed one mother who drove to the school after hearing about the shooting, which prevented her from trying to save her children. Body camera footage also shows one of the officers, Ruben Ruiz, being held back by other officers and prevented from rescuing his wife (a Robb Elementary teacher), who was inside one of the classrooms, dying of a gunshot wound.

At a May 26 press conference, when asked whether first responders had erred in waiting for reinforcements, DPS official Victor Escalon said he did not "have enough information to answer that question yet". In a media interview on the same day, DPS spokesman Chris Olivarez said that if law enforcement "proceeded any further not knowing where the suspect was at, they could've been shot, they could've been killed, and that gunman would have had an opportunity to kill other people inside that school". Uvalde's police chief Daniel Rodriguez defended his officers in a May 26 statement, saying, "It is important for our community to know that our officers responded within minutes". Former Austin and Houston's police chief Art Acevedo tweeted, "We don't have all of the particulars right now, but when gunfire is ringing out with, police are trained, expected, and required to engage, engage, engage. This is a moral and ethical obligation". On May 27, the DPS acknowledged several law enforcement errors that potentially led to greater bloodshed. At a news conference, Steven C. McCraw, the DPS director, said, "From the benefit of hindsight where I'm sitting now, of course it was not the right decision. It was the wrong decision. Period".

On June 2, Texas state senator Roland Gutierrez said that he heard from the Commission on State Emergency Communications that Arredondo did not know of 9-1-1 calls being made by children trapped in a classroom with Ramos. Gutierrez said the Uvalde Police Department was "receiving the 9-1-1 calls for 45 minutes ... while 19 officers were sitting in a hallway ... We don't know if it was being communicated to those people or not". On June 3, Gutierrez said that he heard from DPS that Arredondo had no radio during the shooting. On June 9, The New York Times determined through an investigative review that police officers were aware that there were injured individuals trapped inside classrooms before they decided to breach the entrance.

On June 18, San Antonio Express-News, citing a law enforcement source close to the investigation into the shooting, reported that surveillance video showed that law enforcement did not physically try to open the door to the classrooms Ramos was in for 77 minutes before law enforcement's eventual entry. The surveillance video showed Ramos firing inside classrooms 111 and 112, briefly returning into the hallway, and then going back into the classrooms, said the source; Ramos then shot through the closed door, prompting law enforcement to retreat. San Antonio Express-News reported that law enforcement "might have assumed the door was locked", while their source relayed investigators' belief that Ramos could not have locked the classroom door from the inside; investigators are still determining whether the classroom door was unlocked all along, which may have been caused by a lock malfunction. The source also said that law enforcement, for the entire time, possessed a halligan tool that could have breached a locked classroom door. The source added that Pete Arredondo had tried various keys not on the classroom door to classrooms 111 and 112 where Ramos was in, but on other classrooms nearby in an attempt to identify a master key.

On June 21, Steve McCraw, Texas Department of Public Safety Director, testified during the Texas Senate Committee Meeting on the Uvalde School Shooting that  the police response was an "abject failure and antithetical to everything we have learned over the past two decades" and that the police could have stopped the shooter in three minutes. His statements were the strongest condemnations by Texas state law enforcement of the police response at Uvalde thus far. In particular, McCraw singled out Uvalde school district police Chief Pete Arredondo, whom he identified as the on-scene commander at the incident. McCraw said, "The only thing stopping a hallway of dedicated officers from entering Room 111 and 112 was the on-scene commander who decided to place the lives of officers before the lives of children."

On July 17, the Texas House Investigative Committee released a 77-page report on "systemic failures and egregiously poor decision making" that exacerbated the shooting, and criticized state and federal officials and agencies in addition to local police. The report said a total of 376 law enforcement officials responded to the shooting, including 149 Border Patrol agents and 91 state police officers.  According to The New York Times, the report found that the Uvalde Police chief knew that a child had made 911 calls from inside a classroom, but that "none of the officers who learned of the calls advocated for 'shifting to an active shooter-style response or otherwise acting more urgently to breach the classrooms.'"

Inaccurate initial statements by Texas authorities
Officials, including Texas Governor Greg Abbott and Texas DPS director Steve C. McCraw, gave inaccurate and incomplete initial accounts of the shooting. In many ways, new information from the authorities directly contradicted previous accounts from officials. On May 26, Representative Joaquin Castro of Texas said that state officials "provided conflicting accounts" that contradicted witnesses and called for the FBI to investigate and provide a full account of the incident.

On May 24, Abbott said Ramos had used a handgun and possibly a rifle during the shooting. The claim that Ramos used a handgun was inaccurate. On May 25, Abbott said only one rifle was used during the shooting. Meanwhile, DPS official Erick Estrada said on May 24 that Ramos had "body armor on", but he was later contradicted by DPS official Christopher Olivarez, who said that Ramos was wearing a tactical vest that typically carries magazines, but had no ballistic panels.

On May 25, two DPS officials, Olivarez and Travis Considine, separately said that a school police officer confronted Ramos outside the school, that the two exchanged gunfire, wounding the school police officer, and that Ramos then entered the school. Later on May 25, McCraw said that a school police officer "engaged" Ramos without firing any shots. On May 26, DPS official Victor Escalon said there had been no confrontation between Ramos and a school police officer, and that Ramos had "walked in [to the school] unobstructed", with no "readily available and armed" officer present. On May 27, McCraw said that the school police officer was not at the school when the incident started, but he drove there during the incident, "drove right by" Ramos, and mistakenly confronted a teacher.

On May 25, McCraw, without giving a specific timeline, said law enforcement "engaged immediately. They contained [the gunman] in the classroom, and put the tactical stack together in a very orderly way and breached". McCraw also said on that day that law enforcement "engaged the active shooter and continued to keep him pinned down in that location, until a tactical team" was assembled to breach the room to kill Ramos. On May 26, Escalon said law enforcement had delayed an assault on Ramos because they required "specialty equipment", "body armor", and "precision riflemen, negotiators". Escalon introduced the claim that there had been "negotiations", saying Ramos "did not respond" and "there wasn't much gunfire [during negotiations] other than trying to keep the officers at bay".

On May 26, McCraw claimed that Ramos entered the school from a door "propped open by a teacher". On May 31, a lawyer for the teacher said that the teacher had in fact closed the door after seeing Ramos, having pulled and held the door closed while telling 9-1-1 about the shooting; the teacher "thought the door would lock because that door is always supposed to be locked". Later on May 31, Considine acknowledged that the teacher had indeed closed the door before Ramos entered, but the door "did not lock as it should". On June 21, McCraw stated that the school entrance door could only be locked from the outside, and that the teacher was unaware of that.

On May 27, Abbott said at a press conference that he was "misled" and given "inaccurate" information by law enforcement agencies, adding, "I'm absolutely livid about that." CNN reported that Uvalde Mayor, Don McLaughlin, who sat by Abbott at the press conference, was "left as dumbfounded as the governor by the changing stories of law enforcement".

On June 21, McCraw stated that the classroom door had not been locked by the gunman; the classroom door could only be locked from the outside, not from the inside, and a teacher had reported before the shooting that the classroom door's lock was broken.

City Hall meeting with Steven McCraw on June 2

On June 2, nine days after the mass shooting, there was a private meeting at Uvalde City Hall. The gathering was arranged by Governor Greg Abbott's office, due to "rising tensions between Uvalde officials." Gov. Abbott's general counsel and his chief of staff Luis Saenz were both in attendance as mediators. Various Uvalde civic leaders were also present, including mayor Don McLaughlin, county judge Bill Mitchell, local district attorney Christina Mitchell Busbee, county attorney John Dodson, local police officials, Uvalde assistant city manager Joe Cardenas, and Uvalde city attorney Paul Tarski.

During the meeting, a one-page document titled "narrative" was given to Steven McCraw, the state's top police official. This was presented to him by city attorney Paul Tarski. Uvalde city officials then pressured McCraw to publicly endorse their storyline and hold a press conference in which he was asked to change his depiction of events into a version more favorable to their liking: one in which "the quick arrival of officers at the school" would be promoted, highlighting "their success in containing the gunman." The "narrative" document was made available to The New York Times following a public information request.

The city claimed, "There was zero hesitation on any of these officers’ part, they moved directly toward the gunfire" and "The total number of persons saved by the heroes that are local law enforcement and the other assisting agencies is over 500." The document defended the delayed police response prior to final confrontation with the gunman, stating that time was "not wasted but each minute was used to save lives of children and teachers" and that "Absent the shields, every U.P.D. officer was of the opinion that breaching the door was suicide." However, according to The New York Times, "Some of the footage from the scene raises questions about the city’s account. Video from the hallway of Robb Elementary ... made clear that shields began arriving in the hallway outside the classrooms long before the officers moved in."

The city's description of events also conflicted with Steven McCraw's previous statements to the public, in which he portrayed a scene where officers had not adhered to standard training procedures. The hour-long meeting was "heated", and voices were raised. McCraw refused to endorse the city's narrative as presented to him, saying that he disagreed with their summary. District attorney Busbee also objected to the city's narrative and argued her point with the Uvalde city attorney, saying she was "concerned with the release of inaccurate or incomplete information."

Responses

Ramos' parents 
Ramos' mother said that she had no explanation for her son's attack on the school but that he "had his reasons for doing what he did and please don't judge him. I only want the innocent children who died to forgive me." His father apologized for his son's actions and said, "He should've just killed me, you know, instead of doing something like that."

Survivors and families 
Arnulfo Reyes, the teacher in classroom 111 who lost all 11 of his students present during the shooting, was shot in the arm, lung, and back. Reyes labeled law enforcement as "cowards" for their response during the shooting, saying: "They sit there and did nothing for our community. They took a long time to go in." He also said: "After everything, I get more angry because you [law enforcement] have a bulletproof vest, I have nothing." He commented that no training "gets you ready for this. We trained our kids to sit under the table ... but we set them up to be like ducks ... You can give us all the training you want but gun laws have to change ... I will go anywhere to the end of the world to not let my students die in vain ... I will go to the end of the world to make sure things get changed."

Survivors, family members of survivors, and victims spoke to a Congressional panel, the United States House Committee on Oversight and Reform, about two weeks after the shooting. The testimony was done prior to the House debating a bill on June 8 that would raise the minimum age to 21 to purchase certain firearms and toughen prohibitions on untraceable guns. Multiple survivors from the shooting have expressed their fear of returning to school, and have spoken with media outlets to recount their experiences.

Angeli Gomez, who was handcuffed by police when she ran into the school to rescue her children, was later interviewed by CBS News. She said that she was on probation from charges from a decade prior, and that law enforcement contacted her after the shooting to warn her not to publicize her story because she could face charges for obstruction of justice. Her lawyer later said that she had been harassed by police in two instances, the first when police conducted a traffic stop on her vehicle and falsely accused her of harboring illegal immigrants in it, and the second when a police vehicle stopped outside her home for around 45 minutes and flashed its lights at her and her mother. A special report by the Uvalde Leader News reported that Gomez’s story was false after an investigation into the actions of Ms. Gomez. Gomez has not responded to the news article.

On November 28, 2022, the family of victim Eliahna Torres, including her mother, Sandra, filed a lawsuit alongside Everytown for Gun Safety against gun manufacturer Daniel Defense and gun store Oasis Outback, as well as two dozen additional people and entities. The lawsuit alleged that Daniel Defense markets its AR-15 style rifles by “using militaristic imagery and video game references, by marketing on various social media platforms, and by suggesting that its rifles can be used by civilians for offensive combat-style operations against non-combatants“, as well as accusations of unfair marketing tactics and violation of the Federal Trade Commission Act. Oasis Outback, which delivered the rifle used in the attack to Ramos, was accused of negligent transfer of firearms as well as the fact that the store “had a duty not to sell weapons to the just-turned 18-year-old shooter, who it knew or reasonably should have known was likely to harm himself or others”. Ramos was described by witnesses as “nervous” and “behaving suspiciously” while inside the store. Furthermore, the lawsuit filed charges on the accusation of a “failed law enforcement response”, claiming that Eliahna’s Fourth and Fourteenth Amendment rights were violated when she and her fellow students and teachers were involuntarily confined within their classrooms, accompanying additional unlawful seizure and lack of due process accusations towards the law enforcement defendants.

Reactions from politicians 

President Joe Biden ordered flags at federal buildings to be flown at half-staff. In a televised address on May 24, Biden highlighted that other countries have "mental health problems", "domestic disputes", and "people who are lost, but these kinds of mass shootings never happen with the kind of frequency they happen in America. Why? Why are we willing to live with this carnage?" Biden said that he was "sick and tired" of mass shootings, declaring "we have to act", and calling for "common sense" gun laws. Biden also spoke to Texas Governor Greg Abbott to offer assistance, according to Biden's communications director.

On May 25, Abbott held a press conference where he described the shooting as "evil", "intolerable", and "unacceptable". Abbott continued by saying the shooting "could have been worse" if not for the actions of law enforcement, who he described as having provided a "quick response" and showed "amazing courage by running toward gunfire". He proceeded to blame the shooting on "a problem with mental health illness" in the local community, while saying in the same speech that Ramos had no known criminal or mental health history. During the press conference, Beto O'Rourke, the Democratic nominee in the 2022 Texas gubernatorial election, confronted Abbott by telling him, "You said this was not predictable – this was totally predictable, and you choose not to do anything." Don McLaughlin, the Republican mayor of Uvalde since 2014, told O'Rourke to leave the press conference, calling him a "sick son of a bitch" who was making "a political issue", before O'Rourke was escorted out of the auditorium. O'Rourke later criticized Abbott for reducing mental health services in the state and expanding gun access to 18-year-olds.

The shooting was condemned by former presidents Bill Clinton, Barack Obama, and Donald Trump. Senator Susan Collins (R-ME) described the shooting as an "unbelievably tragic and horrible crime", and she expressed support for red flag laws that help restrict potentially violent individuals from accessing firearms. Senator Ted Cruz (R-TX) called the shooting "yet another act of evil and mass murder". He offered his prayers to the families and children affected by the shooting, and he said that the country has seen "too many of these shootings". Senator Ron Johnson (R-WI) reacted by blaming school shootings in the U.S. on "wokeness", "CRT", and "liberal indoctrination". Texas Attorney General Ken Paxton said that his message for grieving families in Uvalde was: "I believe God always has a plan. Life is short no matter what it is. And certainly, we're not going to make sense of" the killing of children.

Partly based on a rumor started by an anonymous user on the /pol/ imageboard on 4chan, Representative Paul Gosar (R-AZ) made unsubstantiated claims, on Twitter the day after the shooting, that the perpetrator was a "transsexual leftist illegal alien"; the tweet was taken down within two hours. The false claims were further spread by Representative Marjorie Taylor Greene (R-GA) and other far-right House Republicans and conservative media figures and social media users, despite authorities identifying Ramos as an American citizen.

Internationally, the shooting was condemned by various governments and politicians, including by the government of Mexico, which said it was working with American authorities to identify Mexican victims. Mexican consul Ismail Naveja responded by going to Uvalde on the day of the shooting, and Mexico said it was providing consular assistance for Mexican nationals. President Andrés Manuel López Obrador commented on the Hispanic origin of the majority of the victims, noting, "Just look at the surnames; they are children, grandchildren of Mexicans... it hurts us a lot." British Prime Minister Boris Johnson and Leader of the Opposition Keir Starmer both paid tribute to the victims in the House of Commons of the United Kingdom.

The shooting was denounced, among others, by Australian Prime Minister Anthony Albanese, Canadian Prime Minister Justin Trudeau, Chinese diplomat Wang Wenbin, the European Union ambassador to the United States Stavros Lambrinidis, French President Emmanuel Macron, German Chancellor Olaf Scholz, Israeli Prime Minister Naftali Bennett, New Zealand Prime Minister Jacinda Ardern, Ukrainian President Volodymyr Zelenskyy, United Nations Secretary-General António Guterres, and Pope Francis. The human-rights group Amnesty International said, "Among wealthier, developed countries, the U.S. is an outlier when it comes to firearm violence. U.S. governments have allowed gun violence to become a human rights crisis." Gérard Araud, the former French ambassador to the United States during the Obama and Trump administrations, said it was a "craziness without any prospect of improvement".

Actor Matthew McConaughey, who was born in Uvalde, has also expressed his sympathy towards the victims and families. After the incident, McConaughey visited the White House to push for stricter gun laws and mental health reform.

Resulting gun control discussions

Political 

President Biden delivered a speech on the shooting and asked, "When in God's name are we going to stand up to the gun lobby?". His lack of a concrete plan attracted controversy from gun control activists. In a speech given on the night of the shooting, Vice President Kamala Harris reacted to the shooting by calling for policy changes to prevent similar shootings. Senate Majority Leader Chuck Schumer called for the U.S. to pass stricter gun control measures, and he urged Republican members of Congress to resist influence from the National Rifle Association (NRA), a gun-rights lobby that have long been blamed for USA lawmakers' resistance to supporting gun control.

Top Texas Republican officials, such as Abbott, Lieutenant Governor Dan Patrick, Texas House Speaker Dade Phelan of Beaumont, Attorney General Ken Paxton, Representative Tony Gonzales of San Antonio, and Senators Cornyn and Cruz, resisted the possibility of more comprehensive gun control measures. Abbott said that tougher gun regulations were "not a real solution". Instead of gun control, many Senate Republicans called for increasing security presence in schools, limiting entryways into schools, and arming teachers and other school officials.

Republican Senator Ron Johnson promoted the Luke and Alex Safety Act, a bill to create a national database of school safety practices, but was silent on whether he was receding from his longstanding opposition to universal background checks. Johnson's move to advance his bill by unanimous consent was blocked, with Schumer saying that the Senate was "going to vote on gun legislation" through consideration of the Domestic Terrorism Prevention Act, and that Johnson's proposal could be considered as part of that process. Senator Cruz commented that some politicians would politicize the shooting to push for stricter gun reforms. Users on social media accused Cruz of hypocrisy for accepting money from gun interest groups, and for planning to speak at the NRA's annual meeting being held in Houston with Abbott and Cornyn.

NRA and Daniel Defense 
The NRA-ILA's annual leadership forum on May 27 in Houston drew heavy criticism in light of the recent shooting. Former President Donald Trump; governors Kristi Noem and Greg Abbott; Texas Lieutenant Governor Dan Patrick; Senators Ted Cruz and John Cornyn; and Representative Dan Crenshaw were previously scheduled to give remarks. Cornyn and Crenshaw subsequently canceled their attendances, and Abbott announced that he would instead appear at a news conference in Uvalde and send pre-recorded remarks to the NRA convention.

Daniel Defense, the manufacturer of a firearm used in the shooting, decided not to attend. At the event, Trump and other Republicans rejected gun reforms, with Senator Cruz blaming mass shootings in the U.S. on a "cultural sickness" based on fatherless children and an alleged link between violence and video games, and advocated for arming teachers and redesigning schools to have only one entrance and exit. Gun safety advocacy groups such as Moms Demand Action and March for Our Lives, as well as local teachers' unions, Black Lives Matter chapters, the Harris County Democratic Party, and Beto O'Rourke protested outside the convention.

Gun manufacturer Daniel Defense was met with social media criticism in the wake of the shooting, including criticism of a since-deleted Twitter post made on May 16 depicting a child holding a Daniel Defense rifle, causing the company to make many of its social media accounts private.

Mass shooting survivors and families 
Manuel Oliver, a gun control activist and the father of a Stoneman Douglas High School shooting victim, issued a statement expressing his outrage, and said that the families of the victims do not need the thoughts and prayers of politicians; instead, they "need their kids". Several families of the Sandy Hook Elementary School shooting victims spoke out, with several calling for stricter gun control. Fred Guttenberg, whose daughter was killed during the Stoneman Douglas High School shooting, also called for politicians to enact stricter gun control, and expressed support for the families of Robb Elementary School victims.

On June 11, March for Our Lives protests were held across the United States.

Survivors of the 2021 Oxford High School shooting also expressed outrage.

Sports 
In a press conference during the 2022 NBA playoffs, Golden State Warriors head coach Steve Kerr expressed his outrage at the refusal of American politicians to implement laws on gun control, while the Miami Heat urged their fans to contact state senators "demanding their support for common sense gun laws". The social media accounts for the New York Yankees and Tampa Bay Rays began posting facts about gun violence during a game in St. Petersburg, Florida.

Legislative action

Canada
Starting on May 26, Prime Minister Justin Trudeau and the Liberal Party of Canada took steps in proposing new firearms regulations, including a freeze on handgun sales on October 24.

United States
On June 6, the state of New York passed a new law raising the age from 18 to 21 for people to be able to buy semi-automatic weapons.

Protecting Our Kids Act
On June 2, the United States House Committee on the Judiciary proposed the Protecting Our Kids Act. The bill notably excludes an assault weapons ban but includes other measures, such as banning those under 21 from purchasing semi-automatic rifles and the import, sale, manufacture, transfer, or possession of high-capacity magazines, requiring bump stocks to be registered under the National Firearms Act and banning them for civilian use. It also redefines ghost guns to require background checks on all sales, strengthens federal offenses for gun trafficking and straw purchases, creates a compensated buyback program between local governments and individuals surrendering such magazines, along with a new tax credit for the sale of safe storage device at home, and penalizes violations of new safe storage requirements on residences. The House later passed the bill, though it is unlikely to pass the Senate. The International Association of Chiefs of Police and the Fraternal Order of Police wrote to congressional leadership offering to help work on gun measures.

Bipartisan Safer Communities Act
On June 23, the Senate passed the Bipartisan Safer Communities Act with bipartisan support in a 65–33 vote. 15 Senate Republicans voted to support it.

On June 24, the House of Representatives passed the Bipartisan Safer Communities Act with bipartisan support in a 234–193 vote. House Republican leaders opposed the bill and called for other House Republicans to similarly oppose, but 14 House Republicans still voted to support.

On June 25, President Joe Biden signed the Bipartisan Safer Communities Act into law. It was the most significant federal gun reform legislation in almost 30 years, since the Brady Bill of 1993 and the since-expired Federal Assault Weapons Ban of 1994.

See also

References

External links

 Graphic Content Warning: Hallway footage obtained in Uvalde school shooting by KVUE on YouTube
 The portraits of children and teachers by Gianluca Costantini. 
 
 
 
 
 
 
 

2022 active shooter incidents in the United States
2022 crimes in Texas
2022 mass shootings in the United States
2022 murders in the United States
21st-century mass murder in the United States
Articles containing video clips
Attacks on buildings and structures in 2022
Attacks on buildings and structures in Texas
Deaths by firearm in Texas
Elementary school killings in the United States
Elementary school shootings in the United States
Hispanic and Latino American history
Law enforcement controversies in the United States
Law enforcement in Texas
Mass murder in Texas
Mass murder in the United States
Mass shootings in Texas
Mass shootings in the United States
Massacres in 2022
May 2022 crimes in the United States
School massacres in the United States
Uvalde, Texas
School shootings committed by pupils